The enzyme bile-acid 7α-dehydratase catalyzes the chemical reaction

7α,12α-dihydroxy-3-oxochol-4-enoate  12α-hydroxy-3-oxochola-4,6-dienoate + H2O

This enzyme belongs to the family of lyases, specifically the hydro-lyases, which cleave carbon-oxygen bonds.  The systematic name of this enzyme class is 7α,12α-dihydroxy-3-oxochol-4-enoate hydro-lyase (12α-hydroxy-3-oxochola-4,6-dienoate-forming). This enzyme is also called 7α,12α-dihydroxy-3-oxochol-4-enoate hydro-lyase.

References

 

EC 4.2.1
Enzymes of unknown structure